Tinagma ocnerostomellum, the bugloss spear wing, is a moth in the  family Douglasiidae. It is found in Great Britain, Portugal, Spain, France, Belgium, the Netherlands, Germany, Denmark, Austria, Switzerland, Italy, the Czech Republic, Slovakia, Poland, Hungary, North Macedonia, Greece, Norway, Sweden, Finland, the Baltic region, Ukraine and on Sicily and Crete.

The wingspan is 8–9 mm. Adults are fuscous, lightly speckled with white scales. Adults are on wing in June and July. They are active during the day.

The larvae feed on Echium vulgare, from inside the stem. They feed on the pith of their host plant.

References

Moths described in 1850
Douglasiidae